Blom is a Norwegian family descended from Jan Fredriksen (died 1624), a citizen of Skien. His son, parish priest Fredrik Blom (died 1657), Lårdal, adopted the family name Blom. According to playwright Henrik Ibsen, the family was one of the patrician families in Skien. The family is related through marriage to families such as Cappelen, Løvenskiold, Paus and Aall.

The family adopted its coat of arms, featuring a sighthound, in the early 19th century. The coat of arms is loosely based on coats of arms of other families with similar names, not known to be related to this family.

Family members
Some of the well-known family members include

 Christopher Fredriksen Blom (died 1735), Lårdal, forest owner
 Jens Christophersen Blom (1708‑84), married Susanne Paus, a granddaughter of Hans Paus
 Hans Jensen Blom (died 1808), Skien, son of Jens Christophersen Blom and Susanne Paus, ship's captain, shipowner and timber merchant, married Martha Paus (sister of Ole Paus)
 Hans Christophersen Blom (died 1814), Skien, merchant and shipowner
 Andreas Rougtvedt Blom (died 1851), Skien, ship's captain, shipowner, owner of Lagmannsgården in Skien
 Hans Jensen Blom (died 1875), Tysvær, provost and Member of Parliament
 Christine Johanne Blom, Skien, married cabinet minister Niels Aall
 Marie Severine Blom, Skien, married Didrich von Cappelen (died 1828), member of the Eidsvoll assembly in 1814
 Christopher Hansen Blom (died 1879), Skien, shipowner, timber merchant, owner of Bratsberg gård, married Marie Elisabeth née Cappelen (died 1834)
 Søren Martinus Blom (died 1874), Brevik, judge
 Diderik Cappelen Blom (died 1894), Skien, owner of Bratsberg gård
 Bendix Christian Blom (died 1928), Oslo, provost
 Dorothea Christine Blom, Oslo, married Harald Løvenskiold (died 1934), Vækerø

The descendants of the family through female lines include
Henrik Ibsen (through his grandmother Hedevig Paus' grandmother Martha Christophersdatter Blom)
Some descendants of the family have Blom as a middle name, such as
Hans Blom Cappelen (1803-1846)
Christopher Blom Paus (1810-1898)
Christopher Blom Paus (1878-1959)

References

Norwegian families